Chronicles of Elyria is a planned massively multiplayer online role-playing game widely believed to have been a crowdfunding scam. It is in development by Soulbound Studios for Microsoft Windows. The game was planned to utilize a dynamic quest system, feature a closed economy, finite resource management, need-based NPCs, player-run diplomacy, and many other complex gameplay features. The game has received widespread criticism for raising and spending over $9 million, staying in development for over 6 years, yet never releasing any playable content, let alone a playable game, as promised.

Production started in 2016 with initial financing achieved through a crowdfunding campaign on Kickstarter that raised $1.3 million. Subsequent fundraising raised over $7.7 million on their website.

The game was originally marked for an estimated December 2017 release, but this target was not met. In 2020, the game development was placed on an indefinite hiatus, and the studio laid off all of its staff. Several months later, CEO Jeromy Walsh claimed the project had resumed. The developer blog is being updated with information about new developments concerning the game, showcasing the progress being made.

Development 
Chronicles of Elyria had a Kickstarter campaign from May 3 to June 3, 2016 raising $1.36 million, surpassing their goal of $900,000.

Subsequent to the Kickstarter fundraising multiple webstore special events were conducted, such as the Settlers Of Elyria, and Searing Plague events.
 By October 2019, the company had raised over $7.7M.

Initial development saw various iterations and milestones declared as completed against a backdrop of needing to refactor the mechanics of alpha versions of the game (e.g. VoxElyria, Prelyria). A major setback in development was the dropping of SpatialOS as their backend networking/game hosting software.

Layoffs and hiatus
After being delayed from its tentative December 2019 date, a special virtual land auction event called "Settlers of Elyria" was launched on March 12, 2020. On March 20, Soulbound Studios released a pre-alpha, gray box demo showcasing parkour mechanics. Four days later, Soulbound Studios announced the closure of the studio, complete staff layoffs and the indefinite hiatus of the project. On April 9, Walsh released a new statement, claiming that his announcement was misinterpreted and that he would be pursuing continuing the project by having former staff members continue their work on a pro bono basis, while he would seek new sources of funding. On June 26, Walsh released a post on the official site announcing that the transaction logs of users was now available (they were subsequently disabled when then the site was locked). He also stated that a new series of content will be posted on the site (and other media) "in the coming weeks".

On December 17, 2020, Soulbound Studios released a video titled "Inside Chronicles of Elyria - Episode 1" that featured Walsh explaining the current state and future of the company and the game. The video claimed that an independent auditor verified that the revenue backers gave to the company was "properly spent on game development". It also claimed that much of the content developed during the four years of development was not at a point for public consumption, but that many back end features had progressed. Additionally, Walsh announced that the game was continuing active development. Users can no longer make accounts or log in and, as of 2022, the game is no longer functional.

Class action lawsuit 
Following the announcement of Soulbound Studios' closure, days after a land auction, hundreds of backers of Chronicles of Elyria began to organize and explore legal avenues to take against Soulbound Studios and Walsh, in response to the perceived lack of delivery of a tangible product after years of development and millions of dollars in funding. Within days, the office of the attorney general of Washington had received hundreds of filed complaints – among the highest in the state's history. The community around the lawsuit has also shown recent interest in including Xsolla in their lawsuit, accusing Xsolla of violating the terms of service that the backers who had purchased through their service agreed to, by refusing to refund them.

In April 2021 a class action lawsuit was filed in the Central District Court of California, seeking damages for alleged breach of contract, violation of the Consumers Legal Remedies Act, and unfair competition after an announcement was made that Soulbound Studios was closing, all staff had been laid off, and development on the game had ceased due to lack of funds.  The lawsuit was dismissed in October 2022.

References

External links
 Official website

Crowdfunded video games
Fantasy massively multiplayer online role-playing games
Kickstarter-funded video games
Massively multiplayer online role-playing games
Multiplayer and single-player video games
Parkour video games
Role-playing video games
Indie video games
Video games developed in the United States
Video games using procedural generation
Virtual economies
Windows games
Windows-only games
Video game controversies